Theodoros Pahatouridis (Greek: Θεόδωρος Παχατουρίδης; born 4 September 1967) is a retired football defender.

During his club career, Pahatouridis played for Doxa Drama, Olympiacos, Ionikos and AO Chania. He also made 2 appearances for the Greece national football team.

He later became a manager.

References

1967 births
Living people
Footballers from Drama, Greece
Greek footballers
Greece international footballers
Association football forwards
Doxa Drama F.C. players
Olympiacos F.C. players
Ionikos F.C. players
AO Chania F.C. players
Super League Greece players
Super League Greece 2 players

Greek football managers
Iraklis Psachna F.C. managers